The canton of Rhône-Eyrieux (before 2016: canton of La Voulte-sur-Rhône) is an administrative division of the Ardèche department, southern France. Its borders were modified at the French canton reorganisation which came into effect in March 2015. Its seat is in La Voulte-sur-Rhône.

It consists of the following communes:
 
Beauchastel
Boffres
Charmes-sur-Rhône
Châteauneuf-de-Vernoux
Gilhac-et-Bruzac
Saint-Apollinaire-de-Rias
Saint-Cierge-la-Serre
Saint-Fortunat-sur-Eyrieux
Saint-Georges-les-Bains
Saint-Jean-Chambre
Saint-Julien-le-Roux
Saint-Laurent-du-Pape
Silhac
Soyons
Toulaud
Vernoux-en-Vivarais
La Voulte-sur-Rhône

References

Cantons of Ardèche